Raheem the Dream (Micaiah Raheem) is an American rap artist from Atlanta, Georgia who was a pioneering artist in Atlanta's hip hop scene.

References

African-American male rappers
Living people
Rappers from Atlanta
21st-century American rappers
21st-century American male musicians
Year of birth missing (living people)
21st-century African-American musicians